The men's Greco-Roman 60 kilograms is a competition featured at the 2005 World Wrestling Championships, and was held at the László Papp Budapest Sports Arena in Budapest, Hungary on 2 October 2005.

Results
Legend
C — Won by 3 cautions given to the opponent
F — Won by fall

Finals

Top half

Section 1

Section 2

Bottom half

Section 3

Section 4

Repechage

References

Men's Greco-Roman 60 kg